Eleanor Concepcion "Connie" Mariano (born 1958), is a Filipina American physician and retired flag officer in the United States Navy. She is the first Filipino American and graduate of the Uniformed Services University of Medicine to reach the rank of Rear Admiral in the U.S. Navy as well as the second woman to become Physician to the President, a position that placed her as  director of the White House Medical Unit.

Background

Mariano was born at the Santa Rita in Pampanga, Philippines in 1958. Two years later, her parents arrived in the United States. Her father served in the navy as a steward and eventually retired with the rank of Master Chief. Mariano was the valedictorian of her Mar Vista High School, Imperial Beach, California, class of 1973. She graduated from the University of California, San Diego's Revelle College with cum laude honors and a degree in biology.

Mariano joined the U.S. Navy in 1977, and received a medical degree from the Uniformed Services University of Medicine in 1981, graduating as a lieutenant. Following graduation, she served as a doctor on  serving in the Indian Ocean and Western Pacific. By 1991, Mariano was a commander and the division head of internal medicine and director of the internal medicine clinic at the San Diego naval hospital. Only a year away from being eligible for release from active duty, she was nominated by her commanding officer to serve as Navy physician to the White House Medical Unit. She joined the unit in June 1992, serving as a physician to President George H. W. Bush, and was about to be issued new orders to be director of the clinic at the Marine Corps Recruit Depot in San Diego when she was personally selected by the incoming President, Bill Clinton, to be White House Physician and director of the White House Medical Unit. As a result, she received an early promotion to captain on December 7, 1994. In the autumn of 1999, Mariano was nominated by the President to the rank of rear admiral (lower half); she was formally promoted in 2000.

In 2001, Dr. Mariano retired from the Navy and left the White House to join the Mayo Clinic in Scottsdale, Arizona. She was succeeded as White House Physician by Richard Tubb. In 2005, she went on to found the Center for Executive Medicine in Scottsdale.

Hawaii State Senator Will Espero submitted Mariano's name to President Barack Obama for the position of Surgeon General of the United States in May 2009.

She is the author of the book The White House Doctor: My Patients Were Presidents - A Memoir.  With a foreword from Bill Clinton, the autobiographical book takes a look at the personal lives of the three American Presidents and three American First Ladies she had taken care of while working as a Physician to the President.

See also

 Women in the United States Navy
 List of female United States military generals and flag officers

References

External links
 President's Physician Biography
 Center for Executive Medicine
 Asian Pacific American Medical Student Association
 Campaign Contributions
 The White House Doctor Book

1958 births
Living people
United States Navy rear admirals (lower half)
Female admirals of the United States Navy
American military personnel of Filipino descent
American women physicians
People from Imperial Beach, California
University of California, San Diego alumni
Filipino women writers
American writers of Filipino descent
Filipino emigrants to the United States
American military writers
Physicians to the President
American memoirists
American women memoirists
Women military writers
United States Navy Medical Corps officers
21st-century American women
Military personnel from California
Uniformed Services University of the Health Sciences alumni